The 2010 Gillette Fusion ProGlide 500 Presented by Target was a NASCAR Sprint Cup Series race that was held on June 6, 2010 at Pocono Raceway in Long Pond, Pennsylvania. It was the fourteenth race of the 2010 NASCAR Sprint Cup Series season. The event was scheduled to begin at 1 p.m. EDT on TNT, but it was delayed by rain to 3:00 p.m. It was also broadcast on the radio station Motor Racing Network at 12 p.m. EDT. The race consisted of 200 laps, 500 miles (804.67 km).

The race began with Kyle Busch from Joe Gibbs Racing on the pole. Throughout the race there were seven different leaders, fourteen lead changes, and eight cautions.  Denny Hamlin, also from Joe Gibbs Racing, won the 2010 Gillette Fusion ProGlide 500.

Race report

Practice and qualifying 

Three practice sessions were scheduled before the race, one before qualifying on Friday, June 4, 2010, and two on Saturday, June 5, 2010. In the first practice session the quickest five drivers were Jimmie Johnson, Juan Pablo Montoya, Denny Hamlin, Dale Earnhardt Jr., and A. J. Allmendinger. In the second practice, Jimmie Johnson was quickest, while Juan Pablo Montoya, Jeff Burton, Clint Bowyer, and Kyle Busch followed. During the final practice session, Jeff Burton was first fastest, Jimmie Johnson second, Denny Hamlin in third, fourth is Jamie McMurray, and Kevin Harvick fifth.

In qualifying, Kyle Busch won the pole position, while Clint Bowyer, Dale Earnhardt Jr., Kurt Busch, and Denny Hamlin completed the top-five positions. There were 45 entries for the race, but only 43 can race which meant that two drivers would not make the race; they were Terry Cook and Ted Musgrave.

Race summary 
At 12:00 p.m. EDT, Turner Network Television started broadcasting with the "Countdown to Green". At the start of the race, weather was predicted to be mostly cloudy with scattered thunderstorms. At 12:55 p.m. EDT, pre-race ceremonies began with  Mrs. Phil DeRea delivered the invocation, then Clarke Luis performed the national anthem. To start engines, WWE Champion John Cena and the Gillette ProGlide Believers all said the command, "Gentlemen, Start Your Engines!". While under the pace laps, inclement weather moved in the area to cause a two-hour rain delay. During the rain delay, NASCAR decided that there would be a competition caution on lap 15.

At 3:07 p.m. EDT, the green flag waved to start the race. On lap 5, Denny Hamlin passed Kyle Busch for the lead. Ten laps later, the competition caution came out, then most of the drivers came down to make their pit stops . On lap 18, Bobby Labonte stayed out to lead one lap, then he came down to pit. Kyle Busch, on lap 20, led to field on the restart. Kyle Busch led the race until Clint Bowyer passed him on lap 38. Nine laps later, green flag pit stops began. On lap 79, Clint Bowyer made a pit stop and gave the lead to Denny Hamlin, but two laps later, Bowyer regained the lead.

On lap 85, there were only twenty-two cars on the lead lap where Clint Bowyer had lapped twenty-one cars. Twelve laps later, the second caution came out because of debris in turn two. Afterwards, all the lead lap cars made pit stops, and Kyle Busch regained the lead. On lap 101 the restart started with Kevin Harvick, Kyle Busch, Denny Hamlin, Clint Bowyer, and Jimmie Johnson going four wide on the straightaway. Kevin Harvick then became the leader, but on lap 106, his car got loose and went toward the outside wall to give Denny Hamlin the lead. On lap 126, Denny Hamlin continued to lead with 75 lap to go. On lap 131, the second set of green flag pit stops began. One lap later, leader Denny Hamlin made a pit stops, but kept his position on the race track.

On lap 151, the teams were worried because they didn't have enough to make it to the checkered flag. Four laps later, the third caution came out because there was debris on the Long Pond straightaway. After all lead lap cars made pit stops, Denny Hamlin brought the field to the green flag, but on the same lap, the fourth caution came out because Casey Mears, and Elliott Sadler collided. One lap later, Kyle Busch became the leader. On lap 164, the green flag waved as Kyle Busch was the leader. One lap later, Denny Hamlin regained the lead. On lap 167, David Ragan collided with Jamie McMurray to make him collide with the wall which brought out the fifth caution. Most of the leaders made pit stops for fuel, but Kurt Busch stayed out to become the leader on the restart on lap 171.

One lap later, Sam Hornish Jr. passed Kurt Busch for the lead. On lap 175, the sixth caution came out because of debris in turn three. Some of the lead lap cars made pit stops, while the top-ten stayed out. Hornish, Jr, then, brought the field to the green flag on lap 179. Hornish continued to lead until Denny Hamlin passed him on lap 189. Ten laps later, the seventh caution came out because Kevin Harvick and Joey Logano collided. The caution caused a green-white-checkered finish; the restart was on lap 202. Then, one lap later, the white flag was given, but on the backstretch Kasey Kahne was blocked by A. J. Allmendinger, then went through the grass, went toward the outside wall, went airborne as Mark Martin and Greg Biffle collided into him, and went to rest in the middle of the straightaway. The wreck collected a total of 10 cars including Martin Truex Jr., Jeff Gordon, Ryan Newman, Elliott Sadler, Marcos Ambrose, David Ragan, and David Stremme. Then, Denny Hamlin took the checkered flag as he won his fourth race of the 2010 season. Following the race, an altercation ensued between Logano and Harvick's pit crew.

Penalties 
At the time when the race was about to resume after the rain delay, Sprint Cup Series officials noticed that the rear tires of Travis Kvapil's Ford were nearly flat. They made a pit stop while the rest of the field were under the pace laps. After the race, their car went under inspection which showed that the car was using bleeder valves, which were installed on the valve stems to regulate tire pressure. The infraction has one of the severest penalties in NASCAR. The infraction cost the Front Row Motorsports #38 team 150 owner points (Doug Yates is listed as the owner of the #38), Kvapil 150 driver points, USD $100,000, and the suspension of three crew members for twelve weeks. Front Row Motorsports appealed the decision, which knocked the team from 32nd to 36th, forcing the team to qualify on time. The penalties were upheld by NASCAR on June 22, 2010. In an unusual move, the penalty moved the #7 Robby Gordon Motorsports entry back into the Top 35, despite failing to qualify with Ted Musgrave (Robby himself was competing in a Trophy Truck race so Musgrave qualified the car for him). The penalty had a season-long effect on the #38 team, as they were never able to get back into the Top 35 and failed to qualify for three races.

Results

References 

Gillette Fusion ProGlide 500
Gillette Fusion ProGlide 500
NASCAR races at Pocono Raceway